Bamses Venner was a Danish musical group that performed together from 1973 to 2011.

Bamses Venner represented Denmark in the 1980 Eurovision Song Contest with the entry "Tænker altid på dig" (ranked 14th in 19 countries) and received 25 points.

They also recorded "Er du langsom i nat" and "I en lille båd der gynger".

In 1980, the band was composed of Flemming Bamse Jørgensen, lead vocals and bass (nicknamed "Bamse" which means "Teddy Bear"), Mogens Balle (piano/organ), Bjarne Green (guitar), and Arne Østergaard (drums). As of 2004, the band consisted of Jørgensen (vocals, bass), Peter Bødker (piano/organ/guitar), Frank Thøgersen (drums), Torben Fausø (keyboards) and Jes Kerstein (guitar). Bamses Venner sang in Danish.

Jørgensen died on 1 January 2011 from a cardiac arrest. The rest of the band members have decided to break up after a series of planned memorial concerts.

Members 
 bamse, (vocals, bass), 1973-2011
 Jes Halding, (Organ, Keyboards, vocals), 1973-1977
 Roar Odgaard, (Organ, Keyboards, vocals), 1973-1978
 Jan Locht, (drums, vocals), 1973-1978
 Bjarne Gren Jensen, (guitar, vocals), 1973-1981
 Mogens Balle, (Organ, Keyboards, vocals), 1979-1985
 Arne Østergaard, (drums, vocals), 1978-1985
 Frank Lorentzen, (guitar, vocals), 1982-1985
 Torben Fausø, (keyboards, vocals), 1985-2006
 Nelle Walther, (drums), 1985-1996
 Niels Krag, (guitar, vocals), 1985-1998
 John Halskov, (guitar, vocals), 1985-1998
 Frants Solgaard, (bass, guitar, vocals), 1985-1996
 Peter Bødker, (organ, piano, vocals), 1998-2011
 Frank Thøgersen, (drums, vocals), 1998-2011
 Per Zeeberg, (guitar, vocals), 1999-2001
 Thomas Wester, (guitar), 2001-2002
 Jes Kerstein, (guitar, vocals), 2002-2008
 Anders Lampe, (guitar, vocals), 2008-2011

Discography

Albums
 Bamses Venner (1975)
 Mælk og vin (1976)
 Sutsko! (1977)
 Din sang (1977)
 B & V (1978)
 Solen skinner (1979)
 Sådan set (1980)
 Bamse life I (1980)
 Bamse life II (1980)
 Spor 8 (1981)
 Har du lyst (1983)
 Op og ned (1985)
 Rockcreme (1986)
 Lige nu! (1987)
 1988 (1988)
 En helt almindelig mand (1989)
 16 (1990)
 Lyseblå dage (1991)
 Forår (1992)
 Vidt omkring... (1993)
 Vidt omkring (1993)
 Lidt for mig selv (1994)
 Jul på vimmersvej (1995)
 Drenge (1996)
 Mig og mine Venner (1998)
 Brødrene Mortensens jul (1998)
 Stand by me (1999)
 For altid (2000)
 Always on my mind (2001)

Compilation albums

Singles

References

External links
Official website

Eurovision Song Contest entrants for Denmark
Danish pop music groups
Eurovision Song Contest entrants of 1980